Veronica sect. Hebe is a group of plants within the genus Veronica, native to New Zealand, Rapa in French Polynesia, the Falkland Islands and South America. It was formerly treated as the separate genus Hebe. It includes about 90 species. Almost all species occur in New Zealand, apart from Veronica rapensis (endemic to Rapa) and Veronica salicifolia, found in South America. It is named after the Greek goddess of youth, Hebe. Informally, species in the section may be called shrubby veronicas or hebes.

Hebes are widely grown as ornamental plants (see Cultivation below).

Description
Species in Veronica sect. Hebe have four perpendicular rows of leaves in opposite decussate pairs. The flowers are perfect, the corolla usually has four slightly unequal lobes, the flower has two stamens and a long style. Flowers are arranged in a spiked inflorescence. Identification of species is difficult, especially if they are not in flower. The plants range in size from dwarf shrubs to small trees up to 7 metres (23 feet), and are distributed from coastal to alpine ecosystems. Large-leaved species are normally found on the coast, in lowland scrub and along forest margins. At higher altitudes smaller-leaved species grow, and in alpine areas there are whipcord species with leaves reduced to thick scales.

Taxonomy
There are differing classifications for the genus. The former genus Hebe, together with the related Australasian genera Chionohebe, Derwentia, Detzneria, Parahebe, Heliohebe and Leonohebe are now included in the larger genus  Veronica (hence the common name shrubby veronicas).

Species

About 90–100 species were formerly placed in Hebe and have been moved to Veronica, including:

 Hebe acutiflora → Veronica rivalis
 Hebe albicans → Veronica albicans 
 Hebe amplexicaulis → Veronica amplexicaulis 
 Hebe arganthera → Veronica arganthera 
 Hebe armstrongii → Veronica armstrongii 
 Hebe barkeri → Veronica barkeri 
 Hebe bishopiana → Veronica bishopiana 
 Hebe brachysiphon → Veronica brachysiphon 
 Hebe breviracemosa → Veronica breviracemosa 
 Hebe brevifolia → Veronica punicea 
 Hebe buchananii → Veronica buchananii 
 Hebe canterburiensis → Veronica canterburiensis 
 Hebe carnosula → Veronica baylyi 
 Hebe chathamica → Veronica chathamica 
 Hebe cheesmannii → Veronica quadrifaria 
 Hebe ciliolata → Veronica ciliolata 
 Hebe colensoi → Veronica colensoi 
 Hebe cupressoides → Veronica cupressoides 
 Hebe decumbens → Veronica decumbens 
 Hebe dieffenbachii → Veronica dieffenbachii 
 Hebe diosmifolia → Veronica diosmifolia 
 Hebe elliptica → Veronica elliptica 
 Hebe epacridea → Veronica epacridea 
 Hebe gibbsii → Veronica gibbsii 
 Hebe glaucophylla → Veronica glaucophylla 
 Hebe gracillima → Veronica leiophylla
 Hebe haastii → Veronica haastii
 Hebe hectorii → Veronica hectorii
 Hebe hulkeana → Veronica hulkeana
 Hebe lavaudiana → Veronica lavaudiana
 Hebe leiophylla → Veronica leiophylla
 Hebe ligustrifolia → Veronica ligustrifolia
 Hebe lycopodioides → Veronica lycopodioides
 Hebe macrantha → Veronica macrantha
 Hebe matthewsii → Veronica matthewsii
 Hebe obtusata → Veronica obtusata
 Hebe ochracea → Veronica ochracea
 Hebe odora → Veronica odora
 Hebe parviflora → Veronica parviflora
 Hebe pauciramosa → Veronica pauciramosa
 Hebe pauciramosa var. masoniae → Veronica masoniae
 Hebe pimeleoides → Veronica pimeleoides
 Hebe pinguifolia → Veronica pinguifolia
 Hebe propinqua → Veronica propinqua
 Hebe rakaiensis → Veronica rakaiensis
 Hebe raoulii → Veronica raoulii
Hebe recurva was an unplaced name in Plants of the World Online, ; see Veronica recurva
 Hebe salicifolia → Veronica salicifolia
 Hebe salicornioides → Veronica salicornioides
 Hebe speciosa → Veronica speciosa
 Hebe stricta → Veronica stricta
 Hebe subalpina → Veronica subalpina
 Hebe subsimilis → Veronica tetragona subsp. subsimilis
 Hebe tetragona → Veronica tetragona
 Hebe tetrasticha → Veronica tetrasticha
 Hebe topiaria → Veronica topiaria
 Hebe traversii → Veronica traversii
 Hebe trisepala → Veronica diosmifolia
 Hebe venustula → Veronica venustula
 Hebe vernicosa → Veronica vernicosa

Cultivation
Hebes are valued in gardens in temperate climates as evergreen shrubs with decorative (sometimes variegated) leaves. The flowers, in shades of blue, purple, pink or white, appear throughout summer and autumn.  Their ability to withstand salt-laden winds makes them especially suited to coastal areas, for instance the South West of England, where they are often grown as hedges. Prostrate varieties can be used as groundcover.

Hebes cope with most soil types, and can be propagated easily from both seed and cuttings. Wild hybrids in section Hebe are uncommon; however, there are many cultivated hybrids, such as Veronica × franciscana.

The Hebe Society, formed in 1985 under the auspices of the British Royal Horticultural Society, promotes the cultivation and conservation of hebes and other New Zealand native plants.

AGM cultivars
The following cultivars have gained the Royal Horticultural Society's Award of Garden Merit: 

V. albicans (white, 1m)
'Blue Clouds' (pale blue, 1m)
’Caledonia’ (violet, 1m)
'Emerald Gem' (white, 0.3m)
'Great Orme' (pink/white, 1.2m)
V. macrantha  
'Margret'  (light blue, 0.5m)
'Midsummer beauty' (lilac/white, 2.5m)
'Mrs Winder' (violet-blue, 1m)
'Neil's Choice' (violet, 1.2m)
'Nicola's Blush' (pink/white, 1m)
H. ochracea 'James Stirling' (white, 0.5m)
'Oratia Beauty' (pink/white, 0.75m)
'Pascal' (violet-blue, 0.5m)
'Pewter Dome' (white, 05m)
V. pimeloides 'Quicksilver' (pale violet, 0.5m)
V. pinguifolia 'Pagei' (white, 0.3m)
'Pink Elephant'  (white, 0.5m)
V. rakaiensis (white, 1m)
V. recurva 'Boughton Silver' (white, 1m)
'Red Edge' (mauve/white, 0.5m)
'Sapphire' (mauve, 1.5m)
'Silver Queen' (mauve, 1m)
V. topiaria (white, 0.5m)
V. vernicosa (white, 0.5m)
’Wingletye’ (mauve, 0.5m)
'Wiri Dawn' (pale pink, 0.5m)
'Youngii' (violet/white, 0.2m)

Gallery

References

External links
  

Germplasm Resources Information Network: Hebe
The Hebe Society

 
Plantaginaceae genera